The family Clusiaceae was divided by Cronquist into 2 subfamilies: the Clusioideae (typical subfamily) and the Hypericoideae. The latter was often treated as a family - the Hypericaceae or St. John's wort family. Elements of the Hypericoideae are more common in North temperate areas and those of the Clusioideae  are centered in the Tropics.

Later classifications however divide the family in a finer way. The taxonomy below mostly follows that of Stevens. Molecular studies have shown that the family Podostemaceae - the riverweeds - as well as the Theaceae-segregate Bonnetiaceae need to be included in this group. Their inclusions make Clusiaceae in a wide-sense polyphyletic, and Stevens's subfamilies need to be recognised at family level: Clusioideae as Clusiaceae sensu stricto; Hypericoideae as Hypericaceae; and Kielmeyeroideae as Calophyllaceae.

Subfamily Clusioideae
Tribe Clusieae
Chrysochlamys (Balboa, Tovomitopsis)
Clusia (Androstylium, Cochlanthera, Decaphalangium, Havetia, Havetiopsis, Oedematopus, Oxystemon, Pilosperma, Quapoya, Renggeria, Rengifa)
Tovomita (Marialvaea, Tovomitidium)

Tribe Chrysopieae
Chrysopia

Tribe Garcinieae
Garcinia (Brindonia, Cambogia, Clusianthemum, Mangostana, Oxycarpus, Pentaphalangium, Rheedia, Septogarcinia, Tripetalum, Tsimatimia, Verticillaria, Xanthochymus) - saptree, mangosteen

Tribe Moronobeeae
Moronobea

Tribe Platonieae
Platonia (Aristoclesia)

Tribe Symphonieae
Montrouziera
Symphonia

Tribe ?
Allanblackia
Dystovomita
Lorostemon
Pentadesma
Thysanostemon

Subfamily Hypericoideae
This subfamily comprises 3 tribes:

Tribe Cratoxyleae
Cratoxylum (Cratoxylon)
Eliea (Eliaea)
Thornea
Triadenum - marsh St. Johnswort

Tribe Hypericeae
Hypericum (Adenotrias, Androsaemum, Androsemum, Ascyrum, Lianthus, Olympia, Sanidophyllum, Sarothra, Takasagoya, Triadenia) - St John's Wort
Santomasia

Tribe Vismieae
Harungana (Haronga)
Psorospermum
Vismia

Subfamily Kielmeyeroideae
This subfamily comprises 2 tribes:

Tribe Calophylleae (12 genera)
Calophyllum
Caraipa
Clusiella (Asthotheca, Astrotheca)
Haploclathra
Kayea
Kielmeyera
Mahurea
Mammea (Ochrocarpos, Paramammea) - mammee apple (sometimes put in Garcinieae)
Marila
Mesua (Vidalia)
Neotatea
Poeciloneuron

Tribe Endodesmieae (contains 2 African monotypic genera)
Endodesmia
Lebrunia

References

Bibliography 

 

Genera
Taxonomic lists (genera)
Lists of plant genera (alphabetic)